The SBOA Matriculation and Higher Secondary School, Madurai, is one of the schools run by the SBIOA Education Trust of the State Bank of India Officers' Association in Madurai, Tamil Nadu, India. There are 2 other branches: a CBSE School and Feeder Section . The school educates students from LKG to Standard 12. It offers education as per the Matriculation and Higher Secondary board or Tamil Nadu State Board syllabus.  Website :

History
The school was started in 1979 at State Bank Officer's Colony on the bye-pass road in Madurai district of Tamil Nadu. The motto of the school is "Educate and Illuminate!". This is one of the institutions of SBIOA educational trust. Other institutions are:

SBOA School & Junior College, Anna Nagar Western Extension, Chennai.
SBOA Matriculation and Higher Secondary School, Anna Nagar Western Extension, Chennai.
SBIOA Model Matriculation and Higher Secondary School, Mugappair West, Chennai.
SBOA Public (Senior Secondary) School, Ernakulam, Kochi, Kerala.
The S.B.O.A Matric. & Hr.Sec.School, Coimbatore.
SBIOA Matriculation School - Tiruchirapalli.

The school originally started off at the State Bank Officer's colony located on the Bye-pass road. In 1991, classes from VI to X were moved to the sprawling new location on Melakuilkudi Road in Nagamalai Pudukottai. As the years progressed, the remaining classes were also moved to the new locations with the exception of the kindergarten sections which continued in the Feeder Section located on Bye-pass road.

Co-curricular and extra-curricular activities
The school conducts variety of co-curricular activities such as:
Bharat Scouts and Guides, Road Safety Patrol, National Cadet Corps, Junior Red Cross, school band, as well as many extracurricular activities including karate, fashion technology, music, games, etc.

Facilities
Facilities include science labs and a telescope observatory, a conference hall and an open-air auditorium, a basketball court and a playing field. There are also healthcare facilities, a cook shop, a digital library, and an herbal garden.

The school runs school buses from various parts of the city to the campus in Nagamalai Pudukottai. Buses also ply to the Feeder section campus on Bye-pass road. 
The school is also well served by city buses of the Tamil Nadu State Transport Corporation. Buses plying on bye-pass road stop at Ponmeni bus stop which is beside the campus on bye-pass road.
Buses plying to Melakuilkudi stop in front of the campus at Nagamalai Pudukottai. The school had city buses running specifically for the students of the school from Periyar Bus Stand and Anna Bus Stand.

Notable alumni
Karthik Subbaraj

References

External links

 Thehindu.com
 Thehindu.com
 Thehindu.com

Primary schools in Tamil Nadu
High schools and secondary schools in Tamil Nadu
Schools in Madurai
Educational institutions established in 1979
1979 establishments in Tamil Nadu